Anthimos Kapsis (born 3 September 1950) is a Greek former International footballer who played as a sweeper.

Career
Born in Astypalaia, Kapsis' family moved to Keratsini when he was young. Kapsis played for the Panathinaikos F.C. from 1969 until 1984 and was a member of that team when it played in Wembley Stadium, located in London, England, in the 1971 European Cup Final.

Kapsis was capped 36 times by the Greece national team and was a member of the team that competed in Euro 1980. He was also selected to an all-European squad that faced a South American one in a charity game.

Personal life
He is the father of Michalis Kapsis (born 1973), who is also a football player and was included in the squad of Euro 2004 that went on to win the tournament.

See also

List of one-club men in association football

References

External links

Living people
1950 births
20th-century Greek people
Greek footballers
Association football sweepers
Greece international footballers
UEFA Euro 1980 players
Super League Greece players
Panathinaikos F.C. players
Greek football managers
PAS Giannina F.C. managers
Footballers from Piraeus